Howard A. Rodman is a screenwriter, author and professor. He is the former President of the Writers Guild of America, West, professor and former chair of the writing division at the USC School of Cinematic Arts, alumnus of Telluride Association Summer Program and an artistic director of the Sundance Institute Screenwriting Labs.

He is the son of screenwriter Howard Rodman (1920–1985).

Career
In his 20s and early 30s, Rodman was a typist, a legal proofreader, a mail-room clerk, a union organizer (for the Committee of Interns and Residents) and the guitarist for various lower-Manhattan post-punk bands (Made in USA, Arsenal, Soul Sharks). Starting as editor-in-chief of The Cornell Daily Sun, Rodman has published scores of articles in venues including The New York Times, The Los Angeles Times, Los Angeles Magazine, and the Village Voice (for which he was a monthly columnist).

His adaptations of Jim Thompson, David Goodis et al. for Showtime's Fallen Angels anthology series were directed by Steven Soderbergh and Tom Cruise. The screenplays were published in Fallen Angels: Six Noir Tales Told for Television. Rodman then wrote Joe Gould's Secret, which opened the 2000 Sundance festival and was subsequently released by October/USA Films. Rodman's original screenplay F. was selected by Premiere Magazine as one of Hollywood's Ten Best Unproduced Screenplays. Other films include Savage Grace, starring Julianne Moore, and August, with Josh Hartnett, Rip Torn, and David Bowie—both of which had their US premieres at the 2008 Sundance Film Festival. They were released in 2008 from IFC and First Look, respectively. Rodman's screenplay for Savage Grace was nominated for a Spirit Award in the Best Screenplay category.

Destiny Express 

'Destiny Express' was published in January 1990 by Atheneum Books. It was blurbed by Thomas Pynchon, who called it "Daringly imagined and darkly romantic — a moral thriller."

'Destiny Express' is an historical romance. Set in Berlin in March 1933, it explores the stark choices faced by the German filmmaking community – chief among them legendary director Fritz Lang (M.; Metropolis), and his acclaimed wife and collaborator, Thea von Harbou.  Lang was famously offered the position of head of the Reich's film industry by Josef Goebbels, and fled on the next train to Paris; von Harbou stayed, and made films for the Nazis.  Destiny Express is thus the story of the end of a marriage, set in one of history's most crucial junctures.  Other historical figures – Bertolt Brecht, Billy Wilder among them – play significant roles in the novel's intertwined narratives.

The Great Eastern 

The novel The Great Eastern by Howard A. Rodman was published on June 4, 2019, by Melville House Publishing.

In March 2019, the film rights to The Great Eastern were acquired by the UK film company Great Point Media, and Rodman was commissioned to write the screen adaptation.

Reviews

Filmography
 Fallen Angels (American TV series) (1993) (Episode "The Quiet Room")
 Fallen Angels (American TV series) (1993) (Episode "The Frightening Frammis")
 Fallen Angels (American TV series) (1995) (Episode "Professional Man")
 The Hunger (TV series) (1997) (Episode"The Swords")
 The Hunger (TV series) (1997) (Episode "No Radio") (Directed only)
 Joe Gould's Secret (2000)
 Track Down (2000)
 August (2007)
 Savage Grace (2007)

Other activities 
Rodman is a Governor of the Academy of Motion Picture Arts and Sciences. He founded and chairs the Writers Guild Independent Writers Caucus. He has chaired FilmIndependent's Spirit Awards feature film jury as well as the USC Scripter Awards. He is the president of the USC chapter of the American Association of University Professors, a Fellow of the Los Angeles Institute for the Humanities; a former trustee of the Writers Guild Foundation, vice-chair of the Committee on the Professional Status of Writers; and serves on several nonprofit boards, among them the Franco-American Cultural Fund, and Cornell in Hollywood. He is an alumnus of the Seed Fund Board of the Liberty Hill Foundation, and a former editor of The Bill of Rights Journal.

Rodman is also on Los Angeles committee of PEN America. PEN International stands at the intersection of literature and human rights to protect free expression in the United States and worldwide.

He is a member of the National Film Preservation Board, which advises Librarian of Congress on the annual selection of films to the National Film Registry. It also advises on national film preservation planning policy.

Rodman is a member of The Quill and Dagger Society, founded at Cornell University in 1893.

Working with the Library Foundation of Los Angeles, USC, and the Writers Guild, Rodman has conducted public conversations with such writers as Tom Wolfe, Ricky Jay, Jeannette Seaver, Vince Gilligan, Geoff Dyer, and Lady Antonia Fraser.

In November 2019, he was a member of the jury at the Cannes 1939 Film Festival in Orléans France.

Howard Rodman also contributes to the Los Angeles Review of Books. His latest articles include 'After Hours Capitalism: On Tom Lutz's "Born Slippy"' a review of Tom Lutz’s "Born Slippy", published by Repeater Books and 'On the 192nd Anniversary of the Birth of Jules Verne'.

Howard contributed to Black Clock literary magazine, published semi-annually by CalArts in association with its MFA Writing Program. Howard's work was published in issues 4, 5, 10, 13, 19, 20, 21.

Howard contributed the afterword to 'No Room at the Morgue' by Jean-Patrick Manchette, published in 2020 by New York Review Books.

Honors and awards
On October 31, 2013, Rodman was named a Chevalier de l'Ordre des Arts et des Lettres by the French Republic.  In January of 2023 he was promoted from Chevalier to Officier.

In February 2018 he was inducted into Final Draft (software)'s Screenwriters Hall of Fame, alongside Robert Towne, Steven Zaillian, Aaron Sorkin, Nancy Meyers, Paul Schrader, Lawrence Kasdan et al.

In February 2020 Rodman was presented with the USC Associates Award for Artistic Expression, "the highest honor the University bestows on its members for significant artistic impact," by USC Provost Charles Zukoski.

Personal life
He was married to the writer and media scholar Anne Friedberg, author of The Virtual Window. until her death in 2009; they have one son, Tristan Rodman. Their house, the 1957 John Lautner "Zahn Residence," has been widely published. Their work with Lautner in restoring it was chronicled in the February 2002 issue of Dwell magazine.

In June 2017, he wed the artist and professor Mary Beth Heffernan.

References

External links
 
 Howard Rodman's USC faculty page

Living people
People from Los Angeles
American male screenwriters
20th-century American novelists
American instructional writers
Screenwriters from California
American male novelists
American television writers
American male television writers
University of Southern California faculty
Chevaliers of the Ordre des Arts et des Lettres
Screenwriting instructors
20th-century American male writers
Novelists from California
20th-century American non-fiction writers
American male non-fiction writers
Year of birth missing (living people)